Maier is a surname of German origin. 

It is a variant spelling of the more usual "Meyer", which is cognate with the English word "mayor", but with a different meaning.

Individuals with the surname include:

 Anneliese Maier (1905–1971), German historian of philosophy
 Barbara Maier Gustern (19352022), American vocal coach and singer
 Bernhard Maier (born 1963), German professor of religious studies
 Daniela Maier (born 1996), German freestyle skier
 Fred Anton Maier (1938-2015), Norwegian speed skater
 Georg Maier (1941–2021), German actor and theatre director
 Henry Maier (1918–1994), American politician
 Hermann Maier (born 1972), Austrian alpine skier
 Jeffrey Maier (born 1984), 1996 World Series baseball fan
 Jens Maier (born 1962), German politician (AfD)
 Father Joe Maier (born 1939), American-born Thai Redemptorist priest
 Johann Maier von Eck (1486–1543), German Catholic theologian 
 Jonathan Maier (born 1992), German basketball player 
 Lothar Maier (born 1944), German politician
 Merwyn Maier (1909–1942), American bridge player
 Michael Maier (1568–1622), German physician, counselor, alchemist, and epigramist
 Norman Maier (1900-1977), American experimental psychologist
 Patrik Maier (born 1996), Slovak ice hockey player
 Paul Maier (born 1930), American history professor and novelist
 Pauline Maier (1938–2013), American history professor
 Reinhold Maier (1889-1971), German politician
 Rudolf Robert Maier 1824–1888), German pathologist
 Sascha Maier (born 1974), retired German footballer
 Sepp Maier (born 1944), retired German football goalkeeper
 Vivian Maier (1926–2009), amateur photographer
 Walter A. Maier (1893–1950), American radio personality and theologian
 Werner L. Maier (born 1966), retired German football player
 William J. Maier (1876–1941), New York State politician

See also 

 Mair, Mayer, Mayr, Meier, Meir, Meyer, Meyers, Meyr, Miers, Myer, Myer, Myers, Myr, Von Meyer

German-language surnames
Jewish given names
Jewish surnames
Yiddish-language surnames